Glenea niobe is a species of beetle in the family Cerambycidae. It was described by James Thomson in 1879. It is known from Burma and Borneo.

References

niobe
Beetles described in 1879